The South Korean records in swimming are the fastest ever performances of swimmers from South Korea, which are recognised and ratified by the Korea Swimming Federation.

All records were set in finals unless noted otherwise.

Long Course (50 m)

Men

Women

Mixed relay

Short Course (25 m)

Men

Women

Mixed relay

References
General
 South Korean Long Course Records 6 November 2022 updated
Specific

External links
KSF official website

South Korea
Records
Swimming
Swimming